Edwin Mansfield (1930 – 17 November 1997) was a professor of economics at University of Pennsylvania from 1964 and until his death. From 1985 he was also a director of the Center for Economics and Technology.

Edwin Mansfield is best known for his scientific results concerning technological change / diffusion of innovations, and also for his textbooks on microeconomics, managerial economics, and econometrics that were published in millions copies and translated into foreign languages.

References

 Diamond, Arthur M., Jr. 2003. "Edwin Mansfield's Contributions to the Economics of Technology," Research Policy, 32(9), pp. 1607-17.
 Mansfield, Edwin, et al. 2009. Managerial Economics Theory, Applications, and Cases, 7th Edition. Norton. Contents.
 Scherer, F.M.  2005. "Edwin Mansfield: An Appreciation," Essays in Honor of Edwin Mansfield, Part I, Springer,  pp.1-7.  Abstract.
 Teece, David J. 2005. "Technology and Technology Transfer: Mansfieldian Inspirations and Subsequent Developments," Journal of Technology Transfer, 30(1/2), Springer, pp. 17-33. Abstract.

External links
 An obituary on the UPENN website

1930 births
1997 deaths
20th-century American economists
Fellows of the Econometric Society